Dinah Hilary Shearing  (12 February 1926 – 14 June 2021) was an Australian actress, active in all facets of the industry, in particular theatre.

Biography 
Dinah Shearing was born in Sydney, New South Wales to English parents she appeared on stage, radio, television and films in a career that spanned more than 60 years. Subverted from her initial intention of becoming a commercial artist or a singer, having attained honours in exams to A.Mus.A at Sydney Conservatorium in 1945, she began acting with May Hollinworth's Metropolitan Theatre in Sydney. Soon, her “distinctively mellifluous voice”  led to her being recruited into radio during its so-called "Golden Era" where she became a national favourite on serials such as "Dr Paul", "Tudor Princess" and Tudor Queen".

From there, she was drafted into the Elizabethan theatre company and later, The Old Tote company and gave performances that “transcended her young years”, touring nationally from her Sydney base. Most memorably, she gave what critics called "the definitive" performance of Mary Tyrone in Eugene O'Neill's "Long Day's Journey into Night".

Her performances during this period received from Sydney critics, Lindsay Brown and Harry Kippax, superlatives such as "...blazing success..." and "...the best performance in living memory...". In a review, critic Geoffrey Thomas wrote "It happens that I have seen many times, nearly all of the great actresses of Europe and America and, although Miss Shearing's opportunities for stage work have been limited, I would not hesitate to put her in this class."

At the peak of her career, and spurning an offer from the Head of BBC drama in England to work there, she married playwright and painter, Rodney Milgate and retired from full-time acting. The couple had two sons, born in 1961 and 1963 respectively. Shearing only did short bursts of work while her sons grew, but as they became more self-sufficient, she began taking on more and more roles in the theatre, on television, in film and, occasionally, on radio.

She died in June 2021, aged 95.

Honours 
She became a Member of the Order of Australia in 1993.

At the time of her death in June 2021, she resided at Erina, New South Wales, on the Central Coast and had been active in community arts programmes, volunteer work and had also branched into directing.

Radio 
Numerous radio serials, programmes and appearances on the Colgate Hour, The Macquarie Radio Theatre, Lux Radio Theatre and most notably, work with the Australian Broadcasting Corporation, plus Dossier on Demetrius, and Dr Paul (in which she played the leading character for ten years), Tudor Princess and Tudor Queen. These latter three were 1950s Grace Gibson productions.

Theatre 
The Makropoulos Secret (Australian Opera) 2008, Morning Sacrifice 2001, A Cheery Soul 2000, Mother's Day 2000, A Delicate Balance 1998, Love Letters 1997, Medee (Australian Opera) 1995, Coriolanus 1993, The Old Boy 1993, The Winslow Boy 1992, The Hundred Year Ambush 1991, Great Expectations 1990, Shellcove Road 1989, Long Day's Journey into Night 1986 and 1960, Inside the Island 1980, Children 1980, Macbeth (first play performed in the Opera Theatre Sydney Opera House) 1974, What if you Died Tomorrow 1973, Richard II 1973, An Ideal Husband 1971-72, Butley 1971, Tiny Alice 1967, Stravinsky's Persephone (Sydney Symphony Orchestra) 1966, A Country Wife 1965, A Phoenix Too Frequent 1964 and 1952, Murder in the Cathedral 1960, Rape of the Belt 1960, Man and Superman 1959, The Relapse 1959, The Shifting Heart 1958, The Rivals 1956-57, 12th Night 1956-57, numerous theatre performances 1948-55 incl.: Winterset, Twelfth Night, Hotel Universe Country Wife, The First Joanna, Invitation To A Voyage, Deep are the Roots 1948-55, Amphitryon 38, King Lear, The Holly and the Ivy, Bell Book and Candle. She has worked with Sydney and Melbourne Theatre companies, Elizabethan Theatre Trust, Independent Theatre and many others.

Television 
She appeared in Australia's earliest TV dramas.

Farscape 2002 and 2000, All Saints 1999 and 1997, Wildside 1998, G.P. 1994 and 1989, Police Rescue 1993, Eye of the Storm 1991-92, Family and Friends 1991-92, E Street 1989 and 1988, Rafferty's Rules 1988,  A Country Practice 1985-90, Five Mile Creek 1985-1984, Dancing Daze 1985, Saturday Saturday 1984, Special Squad 1984, All the Rivers Run 1983, Learned Friends 1983, The Sullivans 1981-82, The Survivors (TV series) 1970. She has worked with the Nine Network, Crawford Productions, ABC, the Seven Network, Disney International and many others.

Telemovies and films 
Telemovies include: Time and Tide (1999), A Family Matter (1989 film) (1989), A Man of Letters (1983), Macbeth (1960), Sixty Point Bold (1958), A Phoenix too Frequent (1957); Film roles incl.: The Long Wet (2001), A Spy in the Family (1985), (Emmett Stone) 1984, and Buddies (1982).

Directorial and other projects 
Reader for Christchurch Camerata Orchestra 2012, Dir: Wilde Woman (play) 2010, Stopover (play) Katandra Players 2009 and The Fortunates (play) 2008, poetry recitals for Gosford Regional Gallery 2008 and 2003, Dir. Lettice and Lovage (play) The Actor's Forum 2007, Collected Stories (play) The Actor's Forum 2006, 2 monologues for Gosford Regional Gallery and International Women's Day 2005, poetry recitals for SH Ervin Gallery `La Serenissima: The Fascination of Venice' 2003, Dir. Archibald Prize: The Play (jointly) 2003, Winners (play) The Actor's Forum.

Events and voluntary work 
Speaker for Heart Research Institute 1993–99, Volunteer Reader for Blind Society 1960s.

Awards 
 Norman Kessel Award for A Delicate Balance (1999)
 Member of the Order of Australia (1993)
 Critics Award for Coriolanus (1993)
 Glugs (Sydney Theatre Critics) Award for Lifetime of Excellence (1993)
 Penguin Award for Man of Letters (1985)
 Penguin Commendation Award for All the Rivers Run (1985)
 Macquarie Award (1952)

References

See also "National Library of Australia Collection". Papers of Shearing, Dinah. (Ref: MS 5186)-National Library of Australia, Canberra, ACT.

1926 births
2021 deaths
Actresses from New South Wales
Members of the Order of Australia
20th-century Australian actresses
21st-century Australian women
21st-century Australian people